Claudia Mori (born Claudia Moroni, Rome, 12 February 1944) is an Italian producer, former actress and former singer, and wife of the singer Adriano Celentano.

Biography

1960s
She began her career in show business as an actress playing in musicals, then in major films such as Rocco e i suoi fratelli by Luchino Visconti and Sodoma e Gomorra by Robert Aldrich.

In 1963, she met Adriano Celentano on the film set of Uno strano tipo. Celentano left his girlfriend Milena Cantù, and in 1964 he secretly married Claudia at the church of San Francesco in Grosseto. She bore three children: Rosita (1965), Giacomo (1966) and Rosalinda (1968).

In 1964, she acted in Super rapina a Milano, the first film directed by Celentano. Since then her acting career suffered a setback, in favor of that as singer, in 1964, in fact, with Non guardarmi, she recorded her first album. The flip side of the vinyl record includes a cover of Little Eva's "The Loco-Motion".

She achieved a big success while singing with her husband, in 1967 with La coppia più bella del mondo and in 1970, winning the Sanremo Music Festival with "Chi non-lavora non-fa l'amore".

1970s
She returned to the film set many years later, in 1971, with her husband in Er più - Storia d'amore e coltello with Vittorio Caprioli, Romolo Valli, Maurizio Arena and Ninetto Davoli directed by Sergio Corbucci. In 1973 she acted in the film Rugantino, with Adriano Celentano, and played Rosita Flores in L'emigrante, directed by Pasquale Festa Campanile.

In 1974, she recorded the album Fuori tempo, collaborating with Paolo Limiti, who wrote the song "Buonasera dottore", sung with Franco Morgan.

In 1975, Claudia participated in Yuppi du, a film directed by Celentano. In the same year, she starred in the film Culastrisce Nobile Veneziano with Marcello Mastroianni.

Another foray into the world of music was in 1977, with release of the album È amore, with the title song written by Shel Shapiro. It is the first single "Ehi, ehi, ehi", written by Roberto Vecchioni. The LP also contains "Mi vuoi" (written by Ivano Fossati and published the following year on a single version of Marcella Bella) and a cover of Roberto Carlos' "Io bella figlia".

In 1978, she was Marcella in her husband's film Geppo il folle, and in 1979, she took part in the movie Bloodline by Terence Young, with Audrey Hepburn, Ben Gazzara, Irene Papas, Romy Schneider and Omar Sharif.

1980s and 1990s

In 1980, she played Mirandolina in the film La locandiera, directed by Paolo Cavara, with Paolo Villaggio and Milena Vukotic.

In 1982, Claudia returned as a guest at the Sanremo Music Festival, singing the known song "Non succederà più"). The song, which enjoyed some commercial success in Spain, France and Germany, contains a vocal interlude by Adriano Celentano. This success helped the couple at an alleged time of crisis, and therefore the text was understood as autobiographical. In 1988 the song was featured in the Soviet movie Igla (Russian: Игла), starring Viktor Tsoi. In 1984, she released Claudia canta Adriano, an album where she sings her husband's songs.

In 1985, she acted in the film Joan Lui - Ma un giorno nel paese arrivo io di lunedì and participated at the Sanremo Music Festival with the song "Chiudi la porta".

In 1989, she hosted the show Du du du with Pino Caruso; in 1991, she became the CEO of the label Clan Celentano, producing her husband's famous albums, as Mina Celentano (1998). In 1994, Claudia participated at the Sanremo Music Festival with the song "Se mi ami", written by Toto Cutugno.

Recent activities
In 2009, Claudia Mori released the Claudia Mori Collection, containing a CD with her greatest hits and a DVD with a Celentano family private movie. In September 2009, she joined the X Factor judging panel, with Mara Maionchi and Morgan.

Recently she emerged as a TV series and TV movie producer, such as with C'era una volta la città dei matti... ("There Was Once a City of Fools"), with her production company Ciao ragazzi!, winning the Roma FictionFest Special Award for her achievements as a TV producer.

Discography

Albums
Fuori tempo (1974)
È amore (1977)
Claudia canta Adriano (1984)
Chiudi la porta (1985)

Filmography

As an actress

As a producer

References

External links

1944 births
Italian film actresses
Italian women singers
Italian television producers
Living people
Musicians from Rome
Women television producers
Spanish-language singers of Italy
Sanremo Music Festival winners